George McClellan (October 10, 1856 – February 20, 1927) was an American lawyer and politician who served one term as a member of the United States House of Representatives from New York from 1913 to 1915.

Biography 
He was born in Schodack, New York and attended the public schools and the local academies at Columbia County, New York. These were Spencertown and Chatham, New York; was graduated from the Albany Law School in 1880; was admitted to the bar and commenced practice in Chatham; police justice for two terms; president of the Columbia County Agriculture Society for ten years; served as postmaster of Chatham; surrogate of Columbia County 1907–1913.

Congress 
He was elected as a Democrat to the Sixty-third Congress (March 4, 1913 – March 3, 1915), and was an unsuccessful candidate for reelection in 1914 to the Sixty-fourth Congress.

Later career and death 
He was a delegate to the Democratic National Convention in 1920.

After his period in Congress, he resumed the practice of his profession in Chatham, New York; moved to Kinderhook, Columbia County, and died there February 20, 1927; interment in Nassau-Schodack Cemetery at Nassau, New York.

References

Chatham Courier, Columbia Loses Prominent Citizen: Columbia Loses Prominent Man by Death of Hon. George McClellan, February 24, 1927

External links

 

People from Schodack, New York
Albany Law School alumni
New York (state) lawyers
New York (state) postmasters
People from Chatham, New York
1856 births
1927 deaths
Democratic Party members of the United States House of Representatives from New York (state)
19th-century American lawyers